Lunovula cancellata is a species of sea snail, a marine gastropod mollusk in the family Ovulidae, one of the families of cowry allies.

Description
The length of the shell attains .
Size: 3.9 - 9 mm
Locality: Solomons; Philippines; Réunion
Shell ID: 52269

Distribution
This marine species occurs off the Solomon Islands.

References

 Lorenz F. (2007) Two new species of Lunovula (Gastropoda: Caenogastropoda: Ovulidae) from New Caledonia and the Solomon Islands. Visaya 2(1): 64–69.
 Lorenz F. & Fehse D. (2009) The living Ovulidae. A manual of the families of allied cowries: Ovulidae, Pediculariidae and Eocypraeidae. Hackenheim: Conchbooks.

cancellata
Gastropods described in 2007